Nicolas "Nico" Heller, better known as "New York Nico", is an American documentary film director, and social media personality known for his Instagram account @newyorknico. Nicknamed the "Unofficial Talent Scout of New York", Heller uses his platform to share photos, videos and stories showcasing life in New York City.

Early life and career 
Nico is the son of art director Steven Heller and graphic designer Louise Fili. He grew up in New York City and attended The Little Red School House and Elisabeth Irwin High School. He obtained a degree in film from Emerson College and has gone on to create music videos, commercials, documentaries, and more under his production company, Heller Films. He first garnered attention for finding and recording offbeat New Yorkers.

Heller Films' ordinary operation was put on pause during the COVID-19 pandemic, and subsequent lockdown in New York City. During this time, Heller held a contest for Best New York Accent. New Yorkers in quarantine sent him video clips of their accents. The resulting videos went viral, and the project was picked up by mainstream media including The New York Times and CNN.

Heller used the New York-themed contest platform to raise hundreds of thousands of dollars for charity. Small businesses are highlighted regularly on his social media channel to bring awareness to their fight to stay in business during the economic challenges of COVID-19, including Astor Place Hairstylists, Ray's Candy Store, Army & Navy Bags, Veselka and more.

Personal life 
Heller lives in Brooklyn.

MTA collaboration 
In November 2020, Heller announced a venture with MTA to enlist celebrities and notable New Yorkers to record public messages for use in the New York City subway. As of Spring 2020, messages have been recorded by:

 Cam'ron
 Fran Lebowitz
 Whoopi Goldberg
 Young M.A.
 Jerry Seinfeld
 Edie Falco
 Bowen Yang
 Awkwafina
 Angie Martinez
 Bob the Drag Queen
 Debi Mazar
 Michael Rapaport
 Jadakiss
 DesusNice
 The Kid Mero
 MaliibuMitch
 Dave East
 FivioForeign
 Pat Kiernan
 Angela Yee
 Peter Rosenberg
 Ilana Glazer
 Michael Kay
 Eric Andre
 Abbi Jacobson

See also 

 Green Lady of Brooklyn

External links 
 How Does a New Yorker Talk?
 Anti-LGBTQ street preacher drowned out with saxophones on New York street
The Big-Hearted Influence of @NewYorkNico
The Work Diary of the Unofficial Talent Scout of New York City
@NewYorkNico and @Melzy917 on #NewYorkNiConnections and Dating

References 

Living people
Year of birth missing (living people)
People from New York City
21st-century American artists